Irises is one of several paintings of irises by the Dutch artist Vincent van Gogh, and one of a series of paintings he made at the Saint Paul-de-Mausole asylum in Saint-Rémy-de-Provence, France, in the last year before his death in 1890.

Van Gogh started painting Irises within a month of entering the asylum, in May 1889, working from nature in the hospital garden. There is a lack of the high tension which is seen in his later works. He called painting "the lightning conductor for my illness" because he felt that he could keep himself from going insane by continuing to paint.

The painting was probably influenced by Japanese ukiyo-e woodblock prints like many of his works and those by other artists of the time. The similarities occur with strong outlines, unusual angles, including close-up views, and also flattish local color (not modeled according to the fall of light). The painting is full of softness and lightness. Irises is full of life without tragedy.

He considered this painting a study which is probably why there are no known drawings for it, although Theo, Van Gogh's brother, thought better of it and quickly submitted it to the annual exhibition of the Société des Artistes Indépendants in September 1889, together with Starry Night Over the Rhone. He wrote to Vincent of the exhibition: "[It] strikes the eye from afar. The Irises are a beautiful study full of air and life." The painting is one of his most renowned works.

Provenance
The first owner was Julien "Père" Tanguy, a paint grinder and art dealer whose portrait van Gogh painted three times. In 1892 Tanguy sold Irises to art critic and anarchist Octave Mirbeau who was also one of Van Gogh's first supporters. Mirbeau paid 300 francs for it.

In 1987, it became the most expensive painting ever sold, setting a record which stood for two and a half years. Then it was sold for US$53.9 million to Alan Bond, but Bond did not have enough money to pay for it. Irises was later re-sold in 1990 to the J. Paul Getty Museum in Los Angeles. Irises is currently (as of 2022) thirty-first on the inflation-adjusted list of most expensive paintings ever sold and in 102nd place if the effects of inflation are ignored.

References

External links

Van Gogh, paintings and drawings: a special loan exhibition, a fully digitized exhibition catalog from The Metropolitan Museum of Art Libraries, which contains material on this painting (see index)
Irises (Van Gogh)  - Check123 - Video Encyclopedia (video)

Paintings by Vincent van Gogh
Paintings of Saint-Rémy-de-Provence by Vincent van Gogh
1889 paintings
Paintings in the collection of the J. Paul Getty Museum
Flower paintings

ku:Pizîlaq